Asaba-Assay (also Asaba-Ase) is a town in the Ndokwa East Local Government Area of Nigeria Delta State.  It derives its name from the Asse river. It is situated a few kilometres away from the petroleum producing community of Uzere in Isoko South, and approximately six kilometres away from Abari, an Ijaw settlement in the Patani local government area of Delta State. Asaba-Ase is one of the settlement in Ndokwa East recurrently affected by floods The native languages are Ukwuani, Isoko and Ijaw thus making it the meeting point of three out of the four ethnic divisions of Nigeria's Delta State (Edoid, Igboid and Ijoid).

Etymology
Asaba-Assay is derived from the words, "Asaba on the lower Asse river."

History
It is asserted that the initial occupants of the area migrated southwards from Asaba, a town on the lower Niger towards the Asse river thus resulting in the title as "Asaba-Assay" which is "Asaba on the lower Asse river." Some of these migrants intermarried from the Ase clan but are not part of Ase clan.

Difficulties
Asaba-Assay is situated on a flood basin which is almost always flooded, this results to a large population of mosquitoes and other insects thus making life difficult. The access road into and out of the area is prone to be washed away by recurring floods and there is no where an individual can pass through Asaba-Assay to get to. The poverty is high and there's absence of social amenities that makes life comfortable.

Economy
Fishing is the main occupation of the natives. The Asaba-Assay market is also a meeting point between buyers from different places and sellers from various places.

References

Populated places in Delta State